Nomist may refer to:

 Nomism, theological legalism
 Neonomianism, in Christian theology, the doctrine that the Gospel is a new law
 Covenantal nomism